Pisac District is one of eight districts of the province Calca in Peru.

Geography 
Some of the highest mountains of the district are listed below:

 Hatun Wayllarani
 Ichhunayuq
 Machu Kuntur Sinqa
 Ñustapata
 Pukayuq
 Q'ispi Urqu

Ethnic groups 
The people in the district are mainly indigenous citizens of Quechua descent. Quechua is the language which the majority of the population (72.23%) learnt to speak in childhood, 27.15% of the residents started speaking using the Spanish language (2007 Peru Census).

See also 
 Challwaqucha
 Chawaytiri
 Inti Watana
 Kimsaqucha
 Willka Raymi

References